Canada competed at the 1988 Summer Paralympics in Seoul, South Korea. 157 competitors from Canada won 152 medals including 55 gold, 42 silver and 55 bronze and finished 4th in the medal table.

Medalists

See also 
 Canada at the Paralympics
 Canada at the 1988 Summer Olympics

References 

Nations at the 1988 Summer Paralympics
1988
Summer Paralympics